The 2003 WNBA season was the 7th season for the Sacramento Monarchs. The team returned to the conference finals for the first time in two years, only to lose in three games to the Los Angeles Sparks.

Offseason

Dispersal Draft

WNBA Draft

Regular season

Season standings

Season schedule

Player stats

References

Sacramento Monarchs seasons
Sacramento
Sacramento Monarchs